Betty Stanhope-Cole (September 21, 1937 – January 27, 2017) was a Canadian amateur golfer. She is a member of the Canadian Golf Hall of Fame.

Early life
Stanhope-Cole was born in Calgary and moved to Edmonton in her teen years. In her younger years, she played tennis. She was taught how to golf by Edmonton golf pros Alex Olynyk and Henry Martell.

Career
In 1974 and 1976, she was ranked as the top women's golfer in Canada. She was Canadian Junior Girls champion in 1956, Canadian Women's Amateur champion in 1957, and Canadian Ladies' Close champion in 1967. She has also been a member of the Canadian Commonwealth Golf Team (1963, 1971) and Canadian World Team (1964, 1974, and 1976). In 1980, she was inducted into the Alberta Sports Hall of Fame. Stanhope-Cole is also a former curler, having won three Alberta championships as skip.

Achievements 
 1957 Alberta Golf - Ladies Amateur Championship
 1958 Alberta Golf - Ladies Amateur Championship
 1959 Alberta Golf - Ladies Amateur Championship
 1963 Alberta Golf - Ladies Amateur Championship
 1966 Alberta Golf - Ladies Amateur Championship
 1967 Alberta Golf - Ladies Amateur Championship
 1968 Alberta Golf - Ladies Amateur Championship
 1969 Alberta Golf - Ladies Amateur Championship
 1972 Alberta Golf - Ladies Amateur Championship
 1974 Alberta Golf - Ladies Amateur Championship
 1975 Alberta Golf - Ladies Amateur Championship
 1976 Alberta Golf - Ladies Amateur Championship
 1979 Alberta Golf - Ladies Amateur Championship
 1980 Alberta Golf - Ladies Amateur Championship
 1980 - Alberta Sports Hall of Fame (Curling & Golf)
 1982 Alberta Golf - Ladies Amateur Championship
 1984 Alberta Golf - Ladies Amateur Championship
 1988 Alberta Golf - Ladies Amateur Championship
 1989 - #1 ranked senior amateur in Canada.
 1991 - Canadian Golf Hall of Fame
 1993 - Edmonton Sports Hall of Fame
 2005 - Alberta Golf Hall of Fame
 2005 - Alberta Centennial Salute for Sport and Recreation Award
 2011 – Edmonton park named in her honour

Legacy
Betty Stanhope-Cole Park in Edmonton is named for her.

Death
Stanhope-Cole died of cancer in Edmonton on January 27, 2017.

Team appearances
Amateur
Espirito Santo Trophy (representing Canada): 1964, 1974, 1976

References

Canadian female golfers
Amateur golfers
Golfing people from Alberta
Alberta Sports Hall of Fame inductees
Sportspeople from Calgary
Sportspeople from Edmonton
1937 births
2017 deaths